The Historic Brownsville Open was a golf tournament for professional women golfers on the Futures Tour, the LPGA's developmental tour. The event was played in 2009 and 2010. It took place at the Rancho Viejo Country Club & Resort in Rancho Viejo, Texas.

The tournament was a 54-hole event, as are most Futures Tour tournaments, and included pre-tournament pro-am opportunities, in which local amateur golfers played with the professional golfers from the Tour as a benefit for local charities.  The benefiting charities from the Historic Brownsville Open were Friendship of Women and The First Tee of Brownsville.

Winners

Tournament record

External links
Futures Tour official website

Former Symetra Tour events
Golf in Texas